David Freeman is a British singer, musician and songwriter, best known for being a member of the new wave duo The Lover Speaks during the 1980s.

Background
Freeman was born in Ilford, Essex, on 25 September 1957 and moved to Coventry at the age of 15. During the mid-1970s, he began his musical career as guitarist in the band Midnight Circus. In 1976, the band evolved into the punk group The Flys, with Freeman providing guitar and vocals. The band recorded a number of singles, two EPs; Bunch of Fives (1977) and Four From the Square (1980), and two studio albums; Waikiki Beach Refugees (1978) and Own (1979). The band split up in 1980.

In 1983, Freeman released a cover of The Supremes' 1965 hit "Stop in the Name of Love" as his debut solo single. Produced by Neil O'Connor (an ex-The Flys band member), who also played keyboards, Eddie Case played drums and Freeman performed vocals and guitar. It was released by VIP Records. In 1984, Freeman published his own local history book Looking at Muswell Hill.

In 1985, Freeman teamed up with Joseph Hughes, The Flys' former bassist, to form the new wave duo The Lover Speaks. The pair began writing material and also recruited the assistance of keyboardist Barry Gilbert. With the help of Dave Stewart of Eurythmics and Chrissie Hynde of The Pretenders, producer Jimmy Iovine received the duo's demo tape, who then helped them sign to A&M Records in early 1986. Later that year, the duo's self-titled debut album, The Lover Speaks, was released. Produced by Iovine, it contained the single "No More 'I Love You's, which peaked at No. 58 in the UK. A further two singles were lifted from the album; "Tremble Dancing" and "Every Lover's Sign". The latter peaked at No. 6 on the US Billboard Dance Club Songs Chart. A book of Freeman's poetry, Voices of Passion, was published by T.L.S. Publishing in 1987.

In 1987, The Lover Speaks would release a cover of Dusty Springfield's "I Close My Eyes and Count to Ten" as their next single, but it was not a commercial success. During that same year, the duo recorded their second album The Big Lie, however A&M Records decided not to release it. Having worked with Alison Moyet in 1986, the Freeman/Hughes-penned "Sleep Like Breathing" was lifted as the fourth and final single in late 1987 from her album Raindancing. A duet with Freeman, the song reached No. 80 in the UK. The Lover Speaks would split in 1988.

After the duo's split, Freeman began writing and recording his own songs at Dave Stewart's studio. During the late 1980s and the early 1990s, he recorded around ten albums' worth of material with the assistance of various musicians. Freeman's first release came in 1991 with the small, limited release of the album Balance. For the album, Freeman teamed up with former The Lotus Eaters drummer Steve Creese and was also assisted by Chucho Merchán. The release was credited as Free Man/Creese. Another album Under a Tall Tree was given a limited cassette release under the Lover Speaks name, although it did not feature any involvement from Hughes.

In 1995, "No More 'I Love You's was covered by Annie Lennox for her Medusa album. Released as a single in February, the song reached No. 2 on the UK Singles Chart that month and went on to secure Lennox a Grammy Award. In March 1995, Freeman appeared as the opening act for Joe Jackson's concert at the Royal Festival Hall in London. The success of Lennox's cover also saw Freeman and Hughes each receive a BMI award in 1996, as well as three Ivor Novello award nominations; the "PRS Most Performed Work", "International Hit of the Year" and "Best Song Musically and Lyrically".

In the face of the renewed interest in the Lover Speaks, Freeman released much of his solo material on several albums in 1996 via the Discrete label. In chronological order, these releases were: Painting as Autobiography (A Love Story), Balance, Going Out Without Makeup, Under a Tall Tree Looking Up, Apart & Together and Melodrama. The material included on these albums was recorded over the course of a decade, from 1985 to 1996.

In a 2005 article from the Coventry Evening, it was reported that Freeman had spent some years studying the piano and singing in choirs. That same year saw him return to performing with a gig at Earlsdon Cottage in Coventry. In 2010, Freeman's solo version of "No More I Love You's" was released by Discrete as a download-only single on iTunes. In 2014, Discrete would also release a download-only compilation album titled No More I Love You's – The Best of David Freeman. For the 2015 re-issue of The Lover Speaks album by Cherry Red, both Freeman and Hughes contributed to the album's booklet by providing song annotations.

Discography

Albums
1996: Painting as Autobiography (A Love Story)
1996: Balance
1996: Going Out Without Makeup
1996: Under a Tall Tree Looking Up
1996: Apart & Together
1996: Melodrama
2014: No More I Love You's – The Best of David Freeman (compilation)

Singles
"Stop in the Name of Love" (1983)
"Sleep Like Breathing" (Alison Moyet with David Freeman, 1987)
"No More 'I Love You's (2010)

References

1957 births
Living people
A&M Records artists
English male singers
English songwriters
English new wave musicians
Male new wave singers
Musicians from London
People from Ilford
British male songwriters